Chantel Emonson (born 8 May 1993) is an Australian rules footballer playing for  in the AFL Women's (AFLW). She played cricket at state and national levels before competing in the VFL Women's.

Early life 
Emonson is from Berriwillock in the Mallee region of Victoria, Australia. She played football in boys competitions at an early age before she grew too old to participate. Emonson turned to netball and cricket; in her junior cricket career she represented Country Mallee Murray and Country Northern Rivers at state level in under-16 and under-18 competitions from 2008–2011, and Victoria in the national 2009/2010 under-18 championships. She also played for Birchip Cricket Club in the 2009/2010 season. After a 12-year absence from football Emonson returned in 2018 with the Casey Demons in the VFL Women's. She had an injury-plagued season.

AFLW career 
Having not played football for the previous three years, Emonson was eligible to join an AFLW club during the 2018 off-season as a rookie signing. Emonson appeared all seven games in her debut season, playing as a small defender. In June 2021, Emonson was traded to Geelong.

References

External links 

Living people
1993 births
Australian rules footballers from Victoria (Australia)
Melbourne Football Club (AFLW) players
Geelong Football Club (AFLW) players